Heroes in Sui and Tang Dynasties is a Chinese television series based on Chu Renhuo's historical novel Sui Tang Yanyi, which romanticises the historical events leading to the fall of the Sui dynasty and the rise of the Tang dynasty. The series was first broadcast in mainland China on various television networks on 14 January 2013. It is not to be confused with Heroes of Sui and Tang Dynasties 1 & 2, a similar television series also based on the novel, but was released earlier in December 2012. Filming for the series started on 5 November 2011 at the Hengdian World Studios and wrapped up in May 2012.

Cast

 Yan Kuan as Qin Qiong
 Hans Zhang as Luo Cheng
 Jiang Wu as Cheng Yaojin
 Du Chun as Li Shimin (Emperor Taizong of Tang)
 Fu Dalong as Yang Guang (Emperor Yang of Sui)
 Wang Like as Yang Yu'er (Princess Yu)
 Bai Bing as Empress Xiao
 Tang Yixin as Shan Yingying
 Wang Baoqiang as Li Yuanba
 Chen Hao as Yuwen Chengdu
 Hu Dong as Shan Xiongxin
 Yin Xiaotian as Yuchi Gong
 Norman Chui as Yuwen Huaji
 Liu Xiaoxiao as Pei Cuiyun
 Liu Zi Jiao as Hua Da Jiao (Cheng Yao Jin's wife)
 Bobo Gan as Dongfang Yumei
 Siqin Gaowa as Madam Mo (Cheng Yaojin's mother)
 Juanzi as Madam Ning (Qin Qiong's mother)
 Wang Jianxin as Luo Yi
 Zhou Jie as Qin Shengzhu
 Kou Zhenhai as Li Yuan (Emperor Gaozu of Tang)
 Kent Tong as Yang Jian (Emperor Wen of Sui)
 Song Jia as Dugu Qieluo
 Du Yiheng as Xu Maogong
 Wu Qingzhe as Li Mi
 Wang Yizhu as Empress Dou
 Xiao Rongsheng as Yang Lin (Lord Mount)
 Zhang Haoxiang as Wang Bodang
 Wang Junhe as Pei Yuanqing
 Sang Ping as Luo Shixin
 Shi Tianshuo as Chai Shao
 Shi Tiangeng as Wei Zheng
 Zhang Dianfei as Li Yuanji
 Mou Fengbin as Zhai Rang
 Chen Zhihui as Ding Yanping
 Li Xuesong as Xie Yingdeng
 Zhou Fang as Lady Xuanhua
 Zhang Mingming as Wang Junke
 Zhang Ying as You Junda
 Xie Ning as Qi Guoyuan
 Song Leitao as Li Ruhui
 Liu Changde as Luo Song
 Liu Yidan as Dou Xianniang
 Hong Jiantao as Chen Shubao
 Li Donghan as Wu Yunzhao
 Wu Xiaomin as Hong Fu Nü
 Du Haitao as Lai Hu'er
 Zhang Su as Li Jiancheng
 Li Qingxiang as Wang Shichong
 Ren Xuehai as Tang Bi
 Huang Yonggang as Xiong Kuohai
 Liu Bingfeng as Wu Tianxi
 Cao Jun as Han Qinhu
 Ji Hongzhang as He Ruobi
 Li Yihan as Ma Ting; Shan An
 Miao Haizhong as Yang Yong
 Liu Mengmeng as Princess Qionghua
 Choenyi Tsering as Zhang Lihua; Zhu Gui'er
 Liu Can as Fan Hu
 Cao Zichen as Zhang Gongjin
 Cui Bin as Bai Xiandao
 Hu Sutong as Du Wenzhong
 Gong Sile as Jin Cheng
 Lou Yanru as Niu Gai
 Zhang Xin as Yuwen Chenglong
 Zhuang Xiabo as Luo Jia
 Liu Yanyu as Luo Fang
 Shi Chuan as Xue Liang; Chen Changyu
 Ban Jinghui as Gao Ming
 Zhu Rongrong as Shangguan Di
 Zhu Jiazhen as Li Zhong
 Zhou Zhong as Ma Shumou
 Yuan Shuai as Wang Guangyin
 Wang Haocheng as Shan Mian
 Chengmen Lixue as Shan Xiaoxue
 Wu Chengjun as Shan Zhou
 Qi Qinglin as Qiu Rui
 Guo Jun as Wu Jianzhang
 Meng Yansen as Qin Yong
 Zhang Chunzhong as Xin Wenli
 Guan Yu as Li Jing
 Yu Jia'na as Hei Yuenu
 Li Mengyang as Bai Yuejiao
 Lai Jiatong as Pei Yuanshao
 Tanqing Shuoxi as Liu Dapeng
 Min Zheng as Wu Kui
 Hou Jie as Wu Liang
 Gao Ruigang as Wu Anfu
 Gao Hongliang as Dongfang Bai
 Chen Chen as Dongfang Yumu
 Ren Xiaowei as Yuwen Kang
 Ma Yanbin as Master Wukong
 Wang Xiaoqian as Xiaoling
 Wang Yingshan as Xiaoyu

Featured songs
 Wuxing Yao performed by Xuri Yanggang
 Yang Hua Li Shu performed by Sun Nan

International broadcasts

External links
  Heroes in Sui and Tang Dynasties official page on Sina.com
  Heroes in Sui and Tang Dynasties official Weibo

2013 Chinese television series debuts
2013 Chinese television series endings
Television series set in the Sui dynasty
Television series set in the Tang dynasty
Television shows based on Chinese novels
Chinese historical television series
Dragon Television original programming